The 48th General Assembly of Prince Edward Island was in session from February 21, 1956, to August 3, 1959. The Liberal Party led by Alexander Wallace Matheson formed the government.

Augustin Gallant was elected speaker. Edward Foley replaced Gallant as speaker in 1959.

There were four sessions of the 48th General Assembly:

Members

Kings

Prince

Queens

Notes:

References
  Election results for the Prince Edward Island Legislative Assembly, 1955-05-25
 O'Handley, Kathryn Canadian Parliamentary Guide, 1994 

Terms of the General Assembly of Prince Edward Island
1956 establishments in Prince Edward Island
1959 disestablishments in Prince Edward Island